The Marshall County School System consists of public schools serving Marshall County, Alabama, United States.

The current superintendent is Dr. Cindy Wigley, who took office in January 2015.

Member schools

Asbury High School
Brindlee Mountain Middle School
Brindlee Mountain High School
Claysville Junior High School
Kate Duncan Smith DAR School
Douglas Elementary School
Douglas Middle School
Douglas High School
Grassy Elementary School
Marshall County Alternative School
Marshall Technical School
Sloman Primary School
Union Grove Elementary School

External links

  Marshall County School System
 old website (Archive)

School districts in Alabama
Education in Marshall County, Alabama